NGC 7600 is a galaxy about 160 million light-years from Earth, located in the constellation Aquarius. It is classified as a lenticular galaxy, or, more formally, an S0 galaxy.

References

External links
 
 Preprint version of 1999MNRAS.307..967T with images of shell galaxies NGC 474 and NGC 7600
 The formation of shell galaxies similar to NGC 7600 in the cold dark matter cosmogony

7600
Lenticular galaxies
Aquarius (constellation)